Chevalier, mult estes guariz is an anonymous Old French crusade song written between April 1146 and June 1147. The title (in fact, the incipit) translated "Knights, you are under sure protection". The song predates the chansonnier works of the trouvères. The author of the song is not known. He encourages knights to join King Louis VII to fight in the Second Crusade. He was probably a layman and his intended audience the knightly and noble classes.

The song is preserved in a single manuscript, Universitätsbibliothek Erfurt, Dep. Erf., CA 8° 32, copied in England in the later 12th century.

The poet compares the crusade to a tournament arranged by God at Edessa:

Recordings 

 David Munroe & the Early Music Consort of London, Music of the crusades (1971)
 Oliphant,Songs of the Crusades(2000)
 Richard Searles, Jongleurs Dance (2006)
 Jordi Savall& Monserrat Figueras, Jerusalem(2009)
 Toronto Consort, The Way of the Pilgrim (2016)

Citations 

1140s works
12th-century songs
Old French texts
Crusade poetry
Second Crusade